Alegre River may refer to:

Brazil
 Alegre River (Espírito Santo)
 Alegre River (Goiás)
 Alegre River (Guaporé)
 Alegre River (Maranhão)
 Alegre River (Mato Grosso)
 Alegre River (Paraná)
 Alegre River (Rio de Janeiro)

Mexico
 Alegre River (Mexico)

Venezuela
 Alegre River (Venezuela)